A maypole is a tall wooden pole erected as a part of various European folk festivals, around which a maypole dance often takes place.

The festivals may occur on 1 May or Pentecost (Whitsun), although in some countries it is instead erected at Midsummer (20–26 June). In some cases the maypole is a permanent feature that is only utilised during the festival, although in other cases it is erected specifically for the purpose before being taken down again.

Primarily found within the nations of Germanic Europe and the neighbouring areas which they have influenced, its origins remain unknown. It has often been speculated that the maypole originally had some importance in the Germanic paganism of Iron Age and early Medieval cultures, and that the tradition survived Christianisation, albeit losing any original meaning that it had. It has been a recorded practice in many parts of Europe throughout the Medieval and Early Modern periods, although it became less popular in the 18th and 19th centuries. Today, the tradition is still observed in some parts of Europe and among European communities in the Americas.

Symbolism

English historian Ronald Hutton concurs with Swedish scholar Carl Wilhelm von Sydow who stated that maypoles were erected "simply" as "signs that the happy season of warmth and comfort had returned." Their shape allowed for garlands to be hung from them and were first seen, at least in the British Isles, between AD 1350 and 1400 within the context of medieval Christian European culture. In 1588, at Holy Trinity Church in Exeter, villagers gathered around the 'summer rod' for feasting and drinking. Chaucer mentions that a particularly large maypole stood at St Andrew Undershaft, which was collectively erected by church parishioners annually due to its large shape.

The symbolism of the maypole has been continuously debated by folklorists for centuries, although no definitive answer has been found. Some scholars classify maypoles as symbols of the world axis (axis mundi). The fact that they were found primarily in areas of Germanic Europe, where, prior to Christianisation, Germanic paganism was followed in various forms, has led to speculation by some that the maypoles were in some way a relic of a Germanic pagan tradition. One theory holds that they were a remnant of the Germanic reverence for sacred trees, as there is evidence for various sacred trees and wooden pillars that were venerated by the pagans across much of Germanic Europe, including Thor's Oak and the Irminsul. Ronald Hutton, however, states that "there is absolutely no evidence that the maypole was regarded as a reflection of it." It is also known that, in Norse paganism, cosmological views held that the universe was a world tree, known as Yggdrasil.

Some observers have proposed phallic symbolism, an idea which was expressed by Thomas Hobbes, who erroneously believed that the poles dated back to the Roman worship of the god Priapus. This notion has been supported by various figures since, including the psychoanalyst Sigmund Freud. Phallic symbolism has been attributed to the maypole in the later Early Modern period, as one sexual reference is in John Cleland's controversial novel Fanny Hill:
... and now, disengag'd from the shirt, I saw, with wonder and surprise, what? not the play-thing of a boy, not the weapon of a man, but a maypole of so enormous a standard, that had proportions been observ'd, it must have belong'd to a young giant.
Ronald Hutton has stated, however, that "there is no historical basis for his claim, and no sign that the people who used maypoles thought that they were phallic" and that "they were not carved to appear so."

The anthropologist Mircea Eliade theorizes that the maypoles were simply a part of the general rejoicing at the return of summer, and the growth of new vegetation. In this way, they bore similarities with the May Day garlands which were also a common festival practice in Britain and Ireland.

Regional traditions

Malta

Grand Master Marc'Antonio Zondadari introduced the game of cockaigne (with the use of the maypole) to Maltese Carnival in 1721: on a given signal, the crowd assembled in Palace Square converged on a collection of hams, sausages and live animals hidden beneath leafy branches outside the Main Guard. The provisions became the property of those who, having seized them, were able to carry them off.

Germany and Austria

In Germany and Austria the maypole (or ) is a tradition going back to the 16th century. It is a decorated tree or tree trunk that is usually erected either on 1 May – in Baden and Swabia – or on the evening before, for example, in East Frisia. In most areas, especially in Baden-Württemberg, Bavaria and Austria, it is usual to have a ceremony to erect the maypole on the village green. The custom of combining it with a village or town fete, that usually takes place on 30 April 1 May or at Pentecost (Whitsun), is widespread. This tradition is especially strong in the villages of the Bavarian Alps where the raising of the traditional maypole on 1 May in the village square is a cause for much celebration. The pole is usually painted in the Bavarian colours of white and blue and decorated with emblems depicting local crafts and industry.

The actual installation of the tree then takes place in the afternoon or evening. While the crowds usually while away the time drinking beer and eating sausages, the young men busy themselves with decorating the maypole to get the symbols of various trades representing the region into the right position. While the maypole is traditionally set up with the help of long poles, today it may sometime also be done using tractors, forklifts or even cranes. In Lower Austria ropes and ladders are used.

In the Rhineland in and around Cologne, there exists a somewhat different maypole tradition. During the night before 1 May, unmarried men erect young birch trees in front of the houses of their sweethearts. These trees, which may reach five metres of height or more, are sold beforehand by local foresters. The men usually decorate them with multicoloured crepe paper and often with a red heart of wood with the name of the girl written on it. During the month of May, many house front gardens have such maypoles.

Depending on local custom, the  may remain in place all year round or may be taken down at the end of May. The trunk may then be stored until the following year.

Nordic countries

In Denmark, the maypole tradition is almost extinct, but is still observed on the islands of Avernakø and Strynø south of Funen and in a few villages in southern Himmerland in eastern Jutland.

In Sweden and Swedish-speaking parts of Finland, the maypole is usually called a midsummer pole,, as it appears at the Midsummer celebrations, although the literal translation  also occurs, where the word  refers to the Old Swedish word  which means dress, and not the month of May. The traditions surrounding the maypoles vary locally, as does the design of the poles, although the design featuring a cross and two rings is most common nowadays. A perhaps more original incarnation is the one still in use in the Swedish landscape of Småland, where the pole carries a large horizontally suspended ring around it, hanging from ropes attached at the top of the pole. This perhaps more original form of course strongly reinforces the procreation symbolism. The cross-arm may be a latter-day attempt to Christianize the pagan symbol into the semblance of a cross, although not completely successful. Common in all of Sweden are traditional ring dances, mostly in the form of dances where participants alternate dancing and making movements and gestures based on the songs, such as pretending to scrub laundry while singing about washing, or jumping as frogs during the song  ("The little frogs"). The ring dancing is mostly popular with small children. The central part played by young children in the celebration emphasize the procreation aspect of the celebration. Yet another pointer in this direction is the custom that young maidens expect to dream of their future mate if they pick seven different flowers and place them under their pillow when they go to bed on this day only.

Belgium

Hasselt erects its  on 30 April. In that year, a brawl broke out between Leuven and Brussels which saw the latter victorious. A first attempt by Leuven to steal the tree in 1939 was stopped by the police. In 1974 however, a group of Leuven men found out which tree was chosen by Brussels as that year's Meyboom. During the night of 8 August, the tree was cut down and transported to Leuven where it was erected in front of the City Hall. Ever since, Leuven claims ownership of the only official Meyboom. Brussels, however, denies having lost the right, as another tree was cut down and put up before 5pm on 9 August.

It is also customary, mostly in the Dutch-speaking region of Belgium, to place a branch (also called a ) on the highest point of a building under construction. The erection of the branch is often cause for celebration by both the workmen and the neighbours.

United Kingdom

In the United Kingdom, the maypole was found primarily in England and in areas of the Scottish Lowlands and Wales which were under English influence. However, the earliest recorded evidence comes from a Welsh poem written by Gryffydd ap Adda ap Dafydd in the mid-14th century, in which he described how people used a tall birch pole at Llanidloes, central Wales. Literary evidence for maypole use across much of Britain increases in later decades, and "by the period 1350–1400 the custom was well established across southern Britain, in town and country and in both Welsh-speaking and English-speaking areas."

The practice became increasingly popular throughout the ensuing centuries, with the maypoles becoming "communal symbols" that brought the local community together – in some cases, poorer parishes would join up with neighbouring ones in order to obtain and erect one, whilst in other cases, such as in Hertfordshire in 1602 and Warwickshire in 1639, people stole the poles of neighbouring communities, leading to violence. In some cases the wood for the pole was obtained illegally, for instance in 1603, the earl of Huntingdon was angered when trees were removed from his estates for use as maypoles without his permission.

The rise of Protestantism in the 16th century led to increasing disapproval of maypoles and other May Day practices from various Protestants who viewed them as idolatry and therefore immoral. Under the reign of Edward VI in England and Wales, Protestant Anglicanism was declared to be the state religion, and under the Reformation many maypoles, such as the famous Cornhill maypole of London, were destroyed; however when Mary I ascended the throne after Edward's death, she reinstated Roman Catholicism as the state faith, and the practice of maypoles was reinstated. Under later English monarchs, the practice was sporadic, being banned in certain areas, such as Doncaster, Canterbury and Bristol, but continuing in many others, according to the wishes of the local governors. In Scotland meanwhile, which at this time was still an independent state, Protestantism, in the form of Presbyterianism, had taken a more powerful hold, and largely wiped out the practice of maypoles across the country.

Royal support contributed to the outlawing of maypole displays and dancing during the English Interregnum. The Long Parliament's ordinance of 1644 described maypoles as "a Heathenish vanity, generally abused to superstition and wickedness." The only recorded breach of the Long Parliament's prohibition was in 1655 in Henley-in-Arden, where local officials stopped the erection of maypoles for traditional games. Scholars suspect, but have no way to prove, that the lack of such records indicates official connivance in flouting of the prohibition. However, they are certain that the prohibition turned maypole dancing into a symbol of resistance to the Long Parliament and to the republic that followed it.

The church of St Andrew Undershaft in the City of London is named after the maypole that was kept under its eaves and set up each spring until 1517, when student riots put an end to the custom. The maypole itself survived until 1547 when a Puritan mob seized and destroyed it as a "pagan idol".

When the Restoration occurred in 1660, common people in London, in particular, put up maypoles "at every crossway", according to John Aubrey. The largest was the Maypole in the Strand, near the current St Mary-le-Strand church.

In the countryside, may dances and maypoles appeared sporadically even during the Interregnum, but the practice was revived substantially after the Restoration. By the 19th century, the maypole had been subsumed into the symbology of "Merry England". The addition of intertwining ribbons seems to have been influenced by a combination of 19th century theatrical fashion and visionary individuals such as John Ruskin in the 19th century. However, the maypole remained an anti-religious symbol to some theologians, as shown by "The Two Babylons", an anti-Catholic conspiracist pamphlet that first appeared in 1853.

As revived, the dance is performed by pairs of boys and girls (or men and women) who stand alternately around the base of the pole, each holding the end of a ribbon. They weave in and around each other, boys going one way and girls going the other and the ribbons are woven together around the pole until they meet at the base. There are also more complex dances for set numbers of (practised) dancers (the May Queen dancing troupes) involving complicated weaves and unweaves, but they are not well known today. However, such dances are performed every Mayday around the permanent Maypole at Offenham, in Worcestershire. Temporary Maypoles are usually erected on village greens and events are often supervised by local Morris dancing groups.

In some regions, a somewhat different Maypole tradition existed: the carrying of highly decorated sticks. The sticks had hoops or cross-sticks or swags attached, covered with flowers, greenery or artificial materials such as crepe paper. Children would take these hand-held poles to school on May Day morning and prizes may be awarded for the most impressive. This tradition is known as garlanding, and was a central feature of Mayday celebrations in central and southern England until the mid-19th century. After that time, it began to be replaced by formally organised school-centred celebrations. It still occurs from place to place but is invariably a reinstatement of a local custom that had lapsed decades earlier.

In 1780, Kilmarnock Council, now in East Ayrshire, paid Robert Fraser 2s. 6d. for "dressing a Maypole", one of the last recorded examples of the rural festival of the first of May in Scotland, having been put down by Act of Parliament immediately after the Reformation in 1560.

The tallest maypoles in Britain may be found in the villages of Nun Monkton, North Yorkshire, Barwick-in-Elmet, West Yorkshire, Welford-on-Avon, Warwickshire and Paganhill, Gloucestershire (18 metres or 60 feet; although a taller, post-WWI 'Memorial Pole' of 29.5m or 97 ft was previously erected in 1919, making it one of the tallest on record).

Ireland
Holywood in County Down, Northern Ireland has a maypole situated at the crossroads of Main Street and Shore Road/Church Road in the centre of the town. It is the only Maypole in Ireland. Although the origin is uncertain, it is thought that the original maypole dates from the 18th century, when a Dutch ship ran aground off shore. The latest maypole was damaged and removed after a storm in February 2021. The remains were removed by Ards and North Down Borough Council and a replacement pole ordered.

United States

While not celebrated among the general public in the United States today, a Maypole dance nearly identical to that celebrated in the United Kingdom is an important part of May Day celebrations in local schools and communities. Often the Maypole dance will be accompanied by other dances as part of a presentation to the public.

The earliest use of the Maypole in America occurred in 1628, where William Bradford, governor of New Plymouth, wrote of an incident where a number of servants, together with the aid of an agent, broke free from their indentured service to create their own colony, setting up a maypole in the center of the settlement, and behaving in such a way as to receive the scorn and disapproval of the nearby colonies, as well as an officer of the king, bearing patent for the state of Massachusetts. Bradford writes:

They also set up a May-pole, drinking and dancing about it many days togaether, inviting the Indean women, for their consorts, dancing and frisking togither, (like so many fairies, or furies rather,) and worse practises. As if they had anew revived & celebrated the feasts of the Roman Goddess Flora, or the beasly practieses of the madd Bacchinalians. Morton likwise (to shew his poetrie) composed sundry rimes & verses, some tending to lasciviousnes, and others to the detraction & scandall of some persons, which he affixed to this idle or idoll May-polle.  They changed also the name of their place, and instead of calling it Mounte Wollaston, they call it Merie-mounte, as if this joylity would have lasted ever. But this continued not long, for after Morton was sent for England, shortly after came over that worthy gentleman, Mr. John Indecott, who brought a patent under the broad seall, for the governmente of the Massachusetts, who visiting those parts caused the May-polle to be cutt downe, and rebuked them for their profannes, and admonished them to looke ther should be better walking; so they now, or others, changed the name of their place againe, and called it Mounte-Dagon.

Governor Bradford's censure of the Maypole tradition played a central role in Nathaniel Hawthorne's fictional story "The Maypole of Merry Mount", published in 1837.

Italy 

Maypole traditions can be found in some parts of Italy, such as in Veneto, Friuli, Umbria, and Marche. Liberty trees were erected in the southern part of the region in Ripatransone and Ascoli Piceno. In 1889, the first congress of the Second International, met in Paris for the centennial of the French Revolution and the Exposition Universelle. A proposal by Raymond Lavigne, called for international demonstrations on the 1890 anniversary of the Chicago protests. After the institution of the International Workers' Day the maypole rite in southern part of the Marche became a socialist ritual. At the top of the tree (poplar) appeared the red flag. In the second half of the 20th century the rite of the maypole around Ascoli remained a rite of celebration of spring but it became also a political symbol of the peasant movement that struggled against the landowners to have decent living conditions. Every year, even today, on the night of 30 April, in many villages of the zone like Appignano del Tronto, Arquata del Tronto, Ascoli Piceno, Castorano, Castignano, Castel di Lama, Colli del Tronto, Grottammare, Monsampolo del Tronto, Porchia (Montalto Marche), Monteprandone, Offida, Rotella, Spinetoli, San Benedetto del Tronto, citizens cut a poplar on which they put-up a red flag and the tree is erected in village squares or at crossroads.

The same ritual is known from Lamon, a village in the Dolomites in Veneto, which likely predates the Napoleonic period. Here, a number of quarters and hamlets erect a maypole in the form of a larch whose branches and bark are almost completely removed. Only the top branches are left. A red flag is normally attached, although Italian flags or flags of other countries (Colombia, Bolivia for example) or artists (Bob Marley) are also attested. Around the maypole, quarters and hamlets give feasts with music, food and alcohol which usually last until the dawn of 1 May. The maypole is locally called 'Majo' (May in the local dialect).

Canada 

In Canada, maypole dances are sometimes done as part of Victoria Day celebrations which occur in May.  In New Westminster, British Columbia, dancing around the may pole and May Day celebrations have been held for 149 years.

In literature
Poet Jonathan Swift in his poem "A Maypole" describes a maypole as:

"The May-Pole of Merry Mount" is a short story by Nathaniel Hawthorne. It first appeared in The Token and Atlantic Souvenir in 1832. The story revolves around a young couple feeling the influence of nature who get betrothed in the presence of a Maypole and face Puritan ire. Hawthorne based his story on events in colonial New England history, borrowing from a story of Thomas Mortan whose settlement opposed the rigid cultural and religious standards of the Plymouth colony Puritans.

In popular culture
 In Mad Men season 3, Don Draper becomes involved with his daughter Sally's elementary school teacher, Suzanne Farrell, whom he first saw leading her students in an outdoor maypole dance (in "Love Among the Ruins").
 In Frozen, a group of people can be seen raising a maypole as the camera tracks through Arendelle prior to Elsa's coronation.
 Featured in the credits of the popular 1970 series "The Odd Couple".
 A maypole features prominently in the music video to "The Safety Dance" by new wave band Men Without Hats.
 A maypole features prominently in the 1971 Doctor Who serial The Dæmons.
 In the 2019 psychological horror film Midsommar, a maypole dance takes place with the winner being crowned the May Queen.
 In the Netflix series Chilling Adventures of Sabrina, a maypole is used in the festival of Lupercalia.
 In the video game Valheim, a maypole can be found as an Easter egg.
 In the animated Cartoon Network Miniseries Over the Garden Wall, the villagers of the town Pottsfield do a maypole dance in the episode "Hard Times at the Huskin' Bee."

See also
 Axis Mundi
 Beltane
 Ceremonial pole
 Sacred trees and groves in Germanic paganism and mythology
 Walpurgis night

Notes

References

Sources

External links

 Barwick-in-Elmet Maypole Trust A triennial maypole festival held in the village of Barwick-in-Elmet, West Yorkshire.
 Maypole Dancing FAQ Frequently Asked Questions
 Traditional Maypole music and dances with references
 The tradition of the "red" maypole in Piceno (PDF)
 The fall and rise of the Barwick Maypole (film) 

English folk dance
English traditions
Germanic paganism
German folklore
German folk dances
German traditions